George William Wood (21 July 1781 – 3 October 1843) was an English businessman, Member of Parliament and leading member of civil society in Manchester.

Life
George William Wood was born in Leeds, the son of William Wood, a Unitarian minister who was Joseph Priestley's successor at the Mill Hill Chapel, amateur botanist and campaigner against the Test Acts. His mother was Louisa Ann née Oates, the daughter of a wealthy Leeds family.

Wood moved to Manchester around 1801 and became a prominent businessman there but, as a memorial in the Upper Brook Street Chapel cited, "having early in life engaged in commercial pursuits ... he quitted  the pursuits of wealth for the nobler objects of public usefulness." He was member of parliament for Lancashire South from 1832 to 1835, and for Kendal from 1837 until his death. He was a prime mover in the establishment of both the Royal Manchester Institution and the Manchester Mechanics' Institute, and was one of the two inaugural vice-presidents of the Manchester Athenaeum.

He died suddenly of a stroke at a meeting of the Manchester Literary and Philosophical Society.

Honours and offices
Fellow of the Linnaean Society;
Fellow of the Geological Society;
Vice-president of the Manchester Literary and Philosophical Society.

References

Bibliography

Wykes, D. L. (2004) "Wood, William (1745–1808)", Oxford Dictionary of National Biography, Oxford University Press. Retrieved 16 August 2007 (subscription required)

External links 
 

1781 births
1843 deaths
English businesspeople
History of Manchester
UK MPs 1832–1835
UK MPs 1837–1841
UK MPs 1841–1847
Members of the Parliament of the United Kingdom for English constituencies
19th-century British businesspeople
Committee members of the Society for the Diffusion of Useful Knowledge